OV2 or variation, may refer to:

 Orbiting Vehicle 2 (OV2) series of satellites
 OV2-1
 OV2-2
 OV2-3
 OV2-4
 OV2-5
 Operational View 2 (OV-2), Operational Node Connectivity
 British NVC community OV2, in the UK National Vegetation Classification System
 .OV2 file format; see List of filename extensions (M–R)

See also

 
 O2V (disambiguation)
 OVV (disambiguation)
 OW (disambiguation)
 OV (disambiguation)